Francisco Martín Cordovés (1585–1676) was a Spanish architect. He served in Buenos Aires during the Viceroyalty of Peru.

Biography 

Martín Cordovés was born 1584 in Toledo, Spain. Had arrived at the port of Buenos Aires in the late of 16th century. In 1612, he was married to Francisca Rodriguez Varillas. descendant of Gonzalo Rodríguez, and Fernando Joanes de Monroy.

Cordovés exercised the profession of architect, master of stonemason, and appraiser in the Fort of Buenos Aires.

Francisco Martín Cordovés lived more than 90 years something atypical for the time.

References

External links 

1585 births
1676 deaths
People from Buenos Aires
Spanish nobility
Spanish architects
17th-century Argentine people